Naeem Akhtar Afghan (born 29 June 1963) has been Justice of Balochistan High Court since 12 May 2011.

References

1963 births
Living people
Judges of the Balochistan High Court
21st-century Pakistani judges